Get Your Act Together was a British talent show that began airing on ITV on 18 January 2015, hosted by Stephen Mulhern. The show features celebrities learning various different acts, such as juggling, singing, impressions and escapology, and performing them on a live stage.

Production
Get Your Act Together was produced by ITV Studios for ITV, and that aired for 6 weeks from 18 January 2015 until 22 February 2015. The show was presented by Stephen Mulhern and was filmed at The London Studios during the heat rounds and at Fountain Studios during the final.

Contestants
The 26 celebrity contestants were revealed in December 2014.

Episodes
The first five episodes were all pre-recorded with the studio audience deciding who goes through to the live final.

Episode 1: Heat rounds (18 January)

Episode 2: Heat rounds (25 January)

Episode 3: Heat rounds (1 February)

Episode 4: Heat rounds (8 February)

Episode 5: Heat rounds (15 February)

Episode 6: Live final (22 February)

References

External links

2015 British television series debuts
2015 British television series endings
English-language television shows
ITV (TV network) original programming
Television series by ITV Studios